Brenthia diplotaphra is a species of moth of the family Choreutidae. It was described by Edward Meyrick in 1938. It is found in Papua New Guinea.

References

Brenthia
Moths described in 1938
Taxa named by Edward Meyrick